The Military ranks of Nepal are the military insignia used by the Nepalese Army which is the only component of the Nepalese Armed Forces. Being a Landlocked country, Nepal does not have a navy. Nepali military rank structure is a mixture of Indian and Nepal's own style.

Commissioned officer ranks
The rank insignia of commissioned officers.

Former insignia

Other ranks
The rank insignia of non-commissioned officers and enlisted personnel.

References

External links
 

 
Nepal
Military of Nepal